Abul Hossain is a Bangladeshi Army general.

Abul Hossain may also refer to:
 Abul Hossain (politician), Bangladeshi freedom fighter politician
 Abul Hossain (Bangladeshi politician), politician of Rajshahi District of Bangladesh
 Abul Hossain (Jamalpur politician), Bangladeshi politician

See also 

 Abul Hossain Tarun, Bangladeshi politician
 Abul Hossain Khan, Bangladeshi politician
 Abul Hossain Mia, Bangladeshi politician
 Syed Abul Hossain, Bangladeshi politician and businessman
 Sayed Abu Hossain, Bangladeshi Jatiya Party politician

Abul Hussain, Bangladeshi poet
 Abu Hussain Sarkar, Bengali politician